Adolf Zeising (24 September 181027 April 1876) was a German psychologist, whose main interests were mathematics and philosophy.

Among his theories, Zeising claimed to have found the golden ratio expressed in the arrangement of branches along the stems of plants and of veins in leaves. He extended his research to the skeletons of animals and the branchings of their veins and nerves, to the proportions of chemical compounds and the geometry of crystals, even to the use of proportion in artistic endeavors. In these phenomena he saw the golden ratio operating as a universal law,

Many of his studies were followed by Gustav Fechner and Le Corbusier, who elaborated his studies of human proportion to develop the Modulor.

Works 
  (1846)
  (1854)
  (1855)
 . (1855)
  (1856)
  (1856).
  (1858)
  (1861)
  (1864)
   (1865)
  (1865)
  (1869)
  (1869)
  (1873)

Notes

References
Nikolaus Wecklein: Zeising, Adolf. In: Allgemeine Deutsche Biographie (ADB). Band 55, Duncker & Humblot, Leipzig 1910, pp. 404–411 (German)

External links
 

German psychologists
1810 births
1876 deaths